The 2017 KPIT MSLTA Challenger was a professional tennis tournament played on hard courts. It was the fourth edition of the tournament which was part of the 2017 ATP Challenger Tour. It took place in Pune, India from 13 to 18 November 2017.

Singles main-draw entrants

Seeds

 1 Rankings are as of 6 November 2017.

Other entrants
The following players received wildcards into the singles main draw:
  Aryan Goveas
  Arjun Kadhe
  Saketh Myneni
  Vishnu Vardhan

The following players received entry from the qualifying draw:
  Antoine Escoffier
  Borna Gojo
  Hugo Grenier
  Kaichi Uchida

The following player received entry as a lucky loser:
  Vijay Sundar Prashanth

Champions

Singles

  Yuki Bhambri def.  Ramkumar Ramanathan 4–6, 6–3, 6–4.

Doubles

  Tomislav Brkić /  Ante Pavić def.  Pedro Martínez /  Adrián Menéndez Maceiras 6–1, 7–6(7–5).

References

2017 ATP Challenger Tour
2017
2017 in Indian tennis